"P2" is a song by American rapper Lil Uzi Vert. It was released on March 6, 2020, as the 16th track on their album Eternal Atake. It is a sequel to "XO Tour Llif3". The track peaked at number 11 on the Billboard Hot 100.

Background and composition
The track is a sequel to the 2017 single "XO Tour Llif3", which peaked at number seven on the Billboard Hot 100. Uzi teased the track on February 5, 2020, when replying to a fan on Twitter. The track was produced by TM88, who also produced "XO Tour Llif3". The track features the same melody as the original track.

Reception
Michael Saponara of Billboard ranked the track the fourth best from the album, giving props to Uzi "for facing the daunting task of measuring up against his biggest smash to date". Mitch Findlay of HotNewHipHop said that the track "impresses in its ability to honor its predecessor while still sounding like a fresh take", and added that in some ways, the track "even feels like an improvement on the original".

The track debuted at number 11 on the Billboard Hot 100, making it the fifth highest-charting song from the album.

Charts

Certifications

References 

2020 songs
Lil Uzi Vert songs
Songs written by Lil Uzi Vert
Songs written by TM88